The 2022 WNBA season is the current and 24th season for the Minnesota Lynx of the Women's National Basketball Association. The season began on May 6, 2022, versus the Seattle Storm.

On November 28, 2021, Napheesa Collier announced her pregnancy with an announcement in People Magazine. Collier stated, "“I am very excited to start a family with my fiancé Alex. Having a child is truly a beautiful journey and I am grateful to have the support of our families, friends and the Lynx as I begin this special chapter of motherhood.” On December 8, 2021, Cheryl Reeve was named the new United States women's national basketball team head coach for the 2021-2024 cycle.

On February 1, 2022, the Lynx opened free agency and re-signed Sylvia Fowles to a one-year deal. Fowles also announced at this time that this season would be her last and she would be retiring following the 2022 season. 

The Lynx struggled to start the season, losing their first four games and only winning two games in the first month of the season.  They finished May 2–7 overall.  Their struggles continued into June as they won only one of the first seven games in the month and went on a five game losing streak.  However, their fortunes improved at the end of the month as they won three of their last four games to finish the month 4–7.  The momentum carried over into July and the Lynx won four of their first six games, but then only won two of their last five games to finish the season 6–5.  A better August might have seen the Lynx qualify for the playoffs, but they finished the month 2–3, which left them one game out of the eighth and final playoff spot.  This was the first time since 2010, the Lynx missed the playoffs and had a sub-.500 record.

Moriah Jefferson recorded the first-ever triple-double in Lynx history on June 28, 2022. She had 13 points, 10 rebounds, and 10 assists in a 92–64 victory over her former team, the Dallas Wings. The 10 assists were also a career-high for Jefferson.

Napheesa Collier returned to the court on August 7, 2022, just 10 and half weeks after giving birth to her daughter. She finished with 6 points, 2 rebounds, 1 assist, 1 steal, and 1 block in the game.

Transactions

WNBA Draft

Trades and Roster Changes

Roster

Depth

Schedule

Preseason

|- style="background:#fcc;"
| 1
| April 27
| @ Washington
| L 66–78
| Sylvia Fowles (16)
| Sylvia Fowles (8)
| AchonwaTurner (2)
| Entertainment and Sports Arena3,220
| 0–1

|- style="background:#bbffbb;"
| 2
| May 1
| Las Vegas
| W 89–86
| Yvonne Turner (15)
| Rennia Davis (13)
| ClarendonTurnerShepard (3)
| Target CenterN/A
| 1–1

Regular Season

|- style="background:#fcc;"
| 1
| May 6
| @ Seattle
| L 74–97
| Sylvia Fowles (16)
| Jessica Shepard (12)
| Jessica Shepard (5) 
| Climate Pledge Arena 12,904
| 0–1
|- style="background:#fcc;"
| 2
| May 8
| Washington
| L 66–78
| Jessica Shepard (16)
| Jessica Shepard (12)
| Jessica Shepard (4)
| Target Center8,134
| 0–2
|- style="background:#fcc;"
| 3
| May 10
| @ Indiana
| L 76–82
| Sylvia Fowles (26)
| Sylvia Fowles (14)
| Jessica Shepard (9)
| Gainbridge Fieldhouse1,078
| 0–3
|- style="background:#fcc;"
| 4
| May 14
| Chicago
| L 78–82
| Nikolina Milić (18)
| Sylvia Fowles (11)
| JeffersonWestbrook (5)
| Target Center6,503
| 0–4
|- style="background:#bbffbb;"
| 5
| May 17
| @ Los Angeles
| W 87–84
| Kayla McBride (24)
| Sylvia Fowles (12)
| Moriah Jefferson (6)
| Crypto.com Arena4,701
| 1–4
|- style="background:#fcc;"
| 6
| May 19
| @ Las Vegas
| L 87–93
| Aerial Powers (25)
| Jessica Shepard (14)
| Moriah Jefferson (7)
| Michelob Ultra Arena3,640
| 1–5
|- style="background:#fcc;"
| 7
| May 21
| @ Dallas
| L 78–94
| FowlesMcBrideShepard (14)
| Sylvia Fowles (9)
| BanhamJefferson (4)
| College Park Center3,813
| 1–6
|- style="background:#bbffbb;"
| 8
| May 24
| New York
| W 84–78
| Aerial Powers (18)
| Sylvia Fowles (14)
| JeffersonShepard (4)
| Target Center
| 2–6
|- style="background:#fcc;"
| 9
| May 29
| Los Angeles
| L 83–85
| Kayla McBride (19)
| Sylvia Fowles (7)
| Moriah Jefferson (4)
| Target Center7,234
| 2–7
|-

|- style="background:#fcc;"
| 10
| June 1
| @ Atlanta
| L 76–84
| Kayla McBride (20)
| Sylvia Fowles (20)
| Rachel Banham (6)
| Gateway Center Arena1,268
| 2–8
|- style="background:#bbffbb;"
| 11
| June 5
| @ New York
| W 84–77
| Aerial Powers (27)
| Sylvia Fowles (8)
| Rachel Banham (4)
| Barclays Center4,119
| 3–8
|- style="background:#fcc;"
| 12
| June 7
| @ New York
| L 69–88
| Kayla McBride (13)
| Jessica Shepard (7)
| SmallsWestbrook (4)
| Barclays Center3,196
| 3–9
|- style="background:#fcc;"
| 13
| June 10
| Washington
| L 59–76
| Aerial Powers (12)
| Jessica Shepard (15)
| Moriah Jefferson (6)
| Target Center6,315
| 3–10
|- style="background:#fcc;"
| 14
| June 12
| Indiana
| L 80–84
| Nikolina Milić (18)
| Sylvia Fowles (11)
| Aerial Powers (7)
| Target Center6,806
| 3–11
|- style="background:#fcc;"
| 15
| June 14
| Seattle
| L 79–81
| Kayla McBride (20)
| Nikolina Milić (7)
| Aerial Powers (7)
| Target Center6,031
| 3–12
|- style="background:#fcc;"
| 16
| June 19
| @ Las Vegas
| L 95–96
| Moriah Jefferson (23)
| Jessica Shepard (19)
| Moriah Jefferson (7)
| Michelob Ultra Arena4,603
| 3–13
|- style="background:#bbffbb;"
| 17
| June 21
| @ Phoenix
| W 84–71
| Kayla McBride (18)
| Jessica Shepard (13)
| Moriah Jefferson (9)
| Footprint Center6,394
| 4–13
|- style="background:#bbffbb;"
| 18
| June 23
| Phoenix
| W 100–88
| Moriah Jefferson (21)
| Sylvia Fowles (10)
| Aerial Powers (6)
| Target Center8,004
| 5–13
|- style="background:#fcc;"
| 19
| June 26
| @ Chicago
| L 85–88
| McBrideShepard (15)
| Jessica Shepard (8)
| Aerial Powers (7)
| Wintrust Arena7,022
| 5–14
|- style="background:#bbffbb;"
| 20
| June 28
| Dallas
| W 92–64
| Aerial Powers (20)
| Natalie Achonwa (13)
| Moriah Jefferson (10)
| Target Center5,603
| 6–14
|-

|- style="background:#fcc;"
| 21
| July 1
| Las Vegas
| L 85–91
| Rachel Banham (24)
| Sylvia Fowles (5)
| AchonwaBanham (4)
| Target Center6,104
| 6–15
|- style="background:#bbffbb;"
| 22
| July 3
| Las Vegas
| W 102–71
| Aerial Powers (32)
| Sylvia Fowles (11)
| Moriah Jefferson (6)
| Target Center7,603
| 7–15
|- style="background:#bbffbb;"
| 23
| July 6
| Chicago
| W 81–78
| Aerial Powers (22)
| Aerial Powers (11)
| Moriah Jefferson (6)
| Target Center11,103
| 8–15
|- style="background:#bbffbb;"
| 24
| July 12
| Phoenix
| W 118–107 (2OT)
| Aerial Powers (35)
| Sylvia Fowles (14)
| Kayla McBride (5)
| Target Center6,503
| 9–15
|- style="background:#fcc;"
| 25
| July 14
| Dallas
| L 87–92
| Rachel Banham (24)
| Sylvia Fowles (17)
| Sylvia Fowles (3)
| Target Center4,834
| 9–16
|- style="background:#bbffbb;"
| 26
| July 15
| @ Indiana
| W 87–77
| Kayla McBride (28)
| Sylvia Fowles (12)
| JeffersonShepard (5)
| Indiana Farmers Coliseum1,530
| 10–16
|- style="background:#fcc;"
| 27
| July 17
| @ Washington
| L 57–70
| Kayla McBride (16)
| FowlesShepard (12)
| Jessica Shepard (7)
| Entertainment and Sports Arena4,200
| 10–17
|- style="background:#fcc;"
| 28
| July 22
| Connecticut
| L 84–94
| Aerial Powers (14)
| Natalie Achonwa (6)
| Lindsay Allen (7)
| Target Center8,321
| 10–18
|- style="background:#fcc;"
| 29
| July 24
| Connecticut
| L 79–86
| Aerial Powers (17)
| Jessica Shepard (8)
| Aerial Powers (4)
| Target Center7,231
| 10–19
|- style="background:#bbffbb;"
| 30
| July 28
| @ Atlanta
| W 92–85
| Aerial Powers (25)
| Sylvia Fowles (14)
| Moriah Jefferson (7)
| Gateway Center Arena2,396
| 11–19
|- style="background:#bbffbb;"
| 31
| July 31
| @ Los Angeles
| W 84–77
| Moriah Jefferson (22)
| Jessica Shepard (10)
| JeffersonPowers (4)
| Crypto.com Arena6,857
| 12–19
|-

|- style="background:#fcc;"
| 32
| August 3
| @ Seattle
| L 77–89
| Nikolina Milić (13)
| FowlesMilić (6)
| Natalie Achonwa (6)
| Climate Pledge Arena13,500
| 12–20
|- style="background:#bbffbb;"
| 33
| August 7
| Atlanta
| W 81–71
| Kayla McBride (20)
| Sylvia Fowles (8)
| JeffersonMcBride (6)
| Target Center9,421
| 13–20
|- style="background:#bbffbb;"
| 34
| August 10
| @ Phoenix
| W 86–77
| Kayla McBride (18)
| Jessica Shepard (12)
| Moriah Jefferson (12)
| Footprint Center7,307
| 14–20
|- style="background:#fcc;"
| 35
| August 12
| Seattle
| L 69–96
| Aerial Powers (18)
| Sylvia Fowles (12)
| L. AllenMcBride (3)
| Target Center12,134
| 14–21
|- style="background:#fcc;"
| 36
| August 14
| @ Connecticut
| L 83–90
| Lindsay Allen (26)
| Sylvia Fowles (12)
| Lindsay Allen (6)
| Mohegan Sun Arena7,489
| 14–22
|-

Standings

Statistics

Regular Season

‡Waived/Released during the season
†Traded during the season
≠Acquired during the season

Awards and Honors

References

External links

Minnesota Lynx seasons
Minnesota Lynx
Minnesota Lynx